

555001–555100 

|-bgcolor=#f2f2f2
| colspan=4 align=center | 
|}

555101–555200 

|-id=112
| 555112 Monika ||  || Monika Ponikiewska (born 1985) is the fiancée of the astronomer Michal Kusiak, who co-discovered this minor planet. || 
|-id=152
| 555152 Oproiu || || Tiberiu Oproiu (1939–2020) was a Romanian researcher and professor at the Cluj-Napoca Astronomical Institute and University, respectively. || 
|}

555201–555300 

|-id=292
| 555292 Bakels || || Corrie Bakels (born 1942) is a Dutch archaeobotanist || 
|}

555301–555400 

|-bgcolor=#f2f2f2
| colspan=4 align=center | 
|}

555401–555500 

|-id=468
| 555468 Tokarczuk ||  || Olga Tokarczuk (born 1962) is a Polish writer and activist who was awarded the  Her works presents pancultural insight into the eastern European region seen as a land, where large historical events interline with the life of ordinary people. She was awarded the 2018 Nobel Prize in Literature. || 
|}

555501–555600 

|-bgcolor=#f2f2f2
| colspan=4 align=center | 
|}

555601–555700 

|-bgcolor=#f2f2f2
| colspan=4 align=center | 
|}

555701–555800 

|-bgcolor=#f2f2f2
| colspan=4 align=center | 
|}

555801–555900 

|-bgcolor=#f2f2f2
| colspan=4 align=center | 
|}

555901–556000 

|-id=955
| 555955 Lurçat ||  || Jean Lurçat (1892–1966), a French painter, ceramist and designer of tapestry || 
|}

References 

555001-556000